Uhingen is a town in the district of Göppingen in Baden-Württemberg in southern Germany.

History
Uhingen was a possession of the  until 1332.

Geography
The city (Stadt) of Uhingen is located on the north-west of the district of Göppingen, in the German state of Baden-Württemberg. The municipal area lies along the border with the Rems-Murr district to the north. A portion of the municipal area is in the Schurwald region, to the northwest. Elevation above sea level in the municipal area ranges from a low of  Normalnull (NN) to a high of  NN.

The Federally-protected  nature reserve is located in Uhingen's municipal area.

Politics
Uhingen has five more boroughs (Stadtteile): Baiereck, Holzhausen, Sparwiesen, Nassach and Nassachmühle.

Coat of arms
Uhingen's coat of arms displays a field of red crossed by a white, wavy fess complemented with a white canton in the upper left corner of the blazon.

Transportation
Uhingen is a center of local transportation and an infrastructure nexus. It is also connected to Germany's railways by the Fils Valley Railway, which was run through the municipal area in 1847. Public transportation is provided by Deutsche Bahn and the Uhingen Citizens' Bus Association.

References

External links

  (in German)

Towns in Baden-Württemberg
Göppingen (district)